Na'ale (lit. Exalted) is an Israeli settlement in the West Bank. Located near Modi'in, it is organised as a community settlement and falls under the jurisdiction of Mateh Binyamin Regional Council.

The international community considers Israeli settlements in the West Bank illegal under international law, but the Israeli government disputes this.

The settlement of Na'ale was built on land confiscated from the Palestinian towns of Al-Ittihad (Jammala),  Deir Qaddis, and Shabtin.

References

External links
 website nahale.org.il

Israeli settlements in the West Bank
Populated places established in 1988
Mateh Binyamin Regional Council
1988 establishments in the Israeli Civil Administration area
Community settlements